Routt may refer to:
Places
In the United States:
Routt, Louisville, Kentucky
Routt County, Colorado

People
Joe Routt
John Long Routt
Stanford Routt

School
Routt Catholic High School